Not Just Another Cable News Show is a comedy cable news show on CNN: Headline News that premiered on April 5, 2008. It was canceled in March, 2009 and replaced with Issues with Jane Velez-Mitchell. It featured comedians' perspectives on historic events. It formerly aired at 7 pm, 9 pm, midnight, and 5 am on Saturday and Sunday.

References

External links 
 

CNN Headline News original programming
2008 American television series debuts
2009 American television series endings
Television series about television